The State Tax Service of Azerbaijan Republic is the central executive body that ensures the implementation of state tax policy, fulfills timely and full collection of taxes and other revenues to the state budget and exercises state control within the framework of a single financial and budgetary policy implemented in the Republic of Azerbaijan.

History
First Tax Inspection under the Ministry of Finance of Azerbaijan Democratic Republic was established by the decision of the Parliament dated 17 June 1919. Since that time the tax service began its activity.

From 1920 to 1991, tax matters in Azerbaijan were made part of the tax system of the Soviet Union.

After restoration of the independence in July 1990, a Tax Service was set up within the Ministry of Finance of the Republic of Azerbaijan to ensure timely and full collection of taxes and other mandatory payments in the Republic of Azerbaijan, as well as to ensure the state control over legal and physical persons' compliance with tax legislation and state pricing discipline.

In October 1991, Tax Service was separated from the Ministry of Finance for the purpose of improving supervision over compliance to tax legislation, strengthening the role of the state tax service in this area and ensuring the objectivity of its independent activities and supervision. As a result, the independent body, the State Tax Inspectorate of the Republic of Azerbaijan was established.

By the Decree of the President of the Republic of Azerbaijan dated 11 February 2000, the General State Tax Inspectorate was revoked and the Ministry of the Taxes was established to ensure proper state tax policy, timely and full collection of taxes and other mandatory payments as well as state control over that area.

On October 23, 2019, the State Tax Service has been established under the Ministry of Economy of the Republic based on the Decree of the President of Azerbaijan on expanding the functions and structure of the Ministry of Economy.

Duties 
The Ministry carries out following duties as defined by the Statute of the Ministry of Taxes of the Republic of Azerbaijan.

 Ensuring supervision over proper calculation of state taxes and other budget revenues of the Republic of Azerbaijan within the authority of tax bodies, timely and full transfer of funds to the state budget and providing control over tax legislation compliance
 Providing taxpayers with information on tax legislation and amendments made to them and giving explanations regarding calculation and payment of taxes
 Ensuring  protection of taxpayers' rights and legitimate interests
 Investigating issues of tax offences and taking appropriate measures within its competence to eliminate such cases
 To execute other duties defined by the legislation of the Republic of Azerbaijan in accordance with the appointment of the tax authorities.

Functions 
Statute of the Ministry of Taxes of the Republic of Azerbaijan prescribes following functions of the Ministry:

 Developing proposals for improving tax policy of the Republic of Azerbaijan
 Participating in drafting legislation pertaining to taxation area
 Organizing the work of state tax authorities in compliance with tax legislation of the Republic of Azerbaijan, proper calculation, timely and full transfer to the state budget of state taxes and other income, collection of which has been assigned to it by law. 
 Participating in the preparation of the tax revenue forecasts for to the state budget of the Republic of Azerbaijan
 Preparing and implementing measures to ensure compliance with tax legislation of the Republic of Azerbaijan
 Participating in the elaboration and implementation of development programs for state tax authorities of the Republic of Azerbaijan
 Conducting tax accounting (calculated and received for its intended purpose) and producing reports to the President of the Republic of Azerbaijan, the Cabinet of Ministers of the Republic of Azerbaijan and the Ministry of Finance of the Republic of Azerbaijan
 Collecting, analyzing, evaluating information in cases of tax violations, and providing suggestions to relevant authorities to eliminate the case and conditions leading to tax violations.
 Maintaining register of taxpayers, their affiliates, representative offices or other units
 Conducting, criminal tax investigations and carrying out operational and investigative activities in accordance with the law.
 Preparing forms of tax returns, reports and other documents related to the calculation and payment of taxes and other revenues
 Ensuring operation of a unified automated information system of the state tax authorities

Structure
According to the decree signed by the Azerbaijani President Ilham Aliyev on 24 July 2019, the structure of the Ministry of Taxes has been approved as the following way:

 Main Department of National Income
 Main Department of Tax Crime Primary Investigation
 Main Department of Control of Import and Export Operations
 Main Department of Control over Circulation of Excisable Goods and Marking
 Main Department of Local Income of the City of Baku
 Main Department of Work with Small Businesses in Baku
 Call-Center (authorized as a main department)
 Local offices (main offices, departments and divisions)

Training Centre 
Training Centre of the Ministry of Taxes was established by the Decision No. 90 of the Cabinet of Ministers of the Republic of Azerbaijan as of June 5, 2002 on the basis of the Decree No. 539 on the application of the law of the Republic of Azerbaijan, on approval of the Regulation “On service in state tax authorities” signed by the president of the Republic of Azerbaijan, Heydar Aliyev.

A new complex of the Training Center was inaugurated in the village of Nagarakhana of Shamakhi on September 13, 2011, with the participation of the President Ilham Aliyev. The aim of the Center is to carry out educational processes to improve the level of knowledge and vocational training of the employees of tax authorities, ensure practical work and management ability, master new technologies and techniques, as well as adapt training methods  to constantly changing working conditions.

Programs to improve tax administration 

 State program on improvement of tax administration in the Republic of Azerbaijan (2005-2007)

Information resources of the Ministry of Taxes 

“Vergilər” (Taxes) online newspaper - has been published since February 11, 2000. “Vergiler.az” online newspaper has been launched since January 1, 2019, replacing the printed version of “Vergilər” newspaper. The online newspaper “Vergiler.az” is an online news resource that focuses on articles, interviews and news about innovations in taxation and also enlightens economic processes.
"Taxes magazine of Azerbaijan"  was founded by the Ministry of Taxes on July 1, 2003. 158 pages  magazine is published quarterly with a circulation of 1,000 copies. The “Tax Magazine of Azerbaijan” is a regular publication of the Ministry of Taxes. The magazine mainly focuses on current issues, as well as general conceptual matters of taxation with the possibility of publishing articles related to other sectors of the economy.

International ratings 
Azerbaijan ranks 25th among 190 countries in “Doing Business 2019” reflecting the business environment affordability assessment prepared by the World Bank. “Doing Business 2019” rated tax reforms implemented in the country through its “Starting business” and “Paying Taxes” indicators.

Azerbaijan has improved its ranking from 18 to 9 on “Starting a business” indicator as well as moved up from 35th to 28th position on “Paying taxes” indicator.

See also
Cabinet of Azerbaijan
Economy of Azerbaijan
List of company registers
Tax Code of Azerbaijan
Tahmasib Ajdarov

References

External links 
 

Economy of Azerbaijan
Taxes
Azerbaijan, Taxes
2000 establishments in Azerbaijan